is the name of two post stations in Japan during the Edo period:
Nojiri-juku (Nakasendō), the fortieth station on the Nakasendō and the eighth on the Kisoji
Nojiri-shuku (Hokkoku Kaidō), the twelfth station on the Hokkoku Kaidō